Severny Island is a Russian Arctic island. It is the northern island of the Novaya Zemlya archipelago.
It was historically called Lütke Land after Friedrich Benjamin von Lütke, who explored it. It lies approximately 400 km north of the Russian mainland. It is part of Russian Arctic National Park.

Geography
Severny Island is separated from Yuzhny Island (Southern) by the narrow Matochkin Strait. Forty percent of the island is covered by the Severny Island ice cap, which is the largest glacier by area and by volume in Europe (if counted as part of it). Severny Island is known for its numerous glaciers. Cape Flissingsky is the easternmost point of Severny Island.

Climate
The climate for Severny Island is extremely cold, with even the warmest months not reaching the freezing mark. The climate is severe, and temperature varies from 3° to -8° F (-16° to -22° C) in winter to 36° to 44° F (2° to 7° C) in summer. There are frequent fogs and strong winds

Ice cap and glaciers

Unlike Yuzhny Island, Severny has an inner ice cap with numerous glaciers, most of which have their terminus on the eastern or western shore of the island.

History
The cape of Sukhoy Nos, located at the southern end of the island, was used for nuclear weapons testing between 1958 and 1961. The Tsar Bomba hydrogen bomb test on October 30, 1961 destroyed all buildings in the village of Severny (both wooden and brick). The village was located 55 kilometres (34 miles) from ground zero within the Sukhoy Nos test range. Tsar Bomba was the most powerful nuclear weapon detonated and was the most powerful anthropogenic explosion in human history. It had a yield of 50 megatons of TNT, scaled down from its maximum 100 megaton design yield. Severny is now the site of a Russian Army base and has a harbor.

There is a meteorological station at Cape Zhelaniya, Severny's northernmost cape.

Gallery

See also

 Desert island
 Gora Severny Nunatak
 List of islands of Russia
 List of glaciers in Russia
 List of fjords of Russia
 Tsar Bomba

References

Islands of Novaya Zemlya
Islands of Arkhangelsk Oblast
Islands of the Barents Sea
Islands of the Kara Sea
Nuclear weapons programme of Russia
Nuclear weapons testing